Bilecik District (also: Merkez, meaning "central") is a district of Bilecik Province of Turkey. Its seat is the city of Bilecik. Its area is 793 km2, and its population is 86,442 (2021).

Composition
There are three municipalities in Bilecik District:
 Bayırköy
 Bilecik
 Vezirhan

There are 45 villages in Bilecik District:

 Abadiye
 Abbaslık
 Ahmetpınar
 Alpağut
 Ayvacık
 Bahçecik
 Başköy
 Bekdemir
 Beyce
 Çakırpınar
 Çavuşköy
 Çukurören
 Cumalı
 Deresakarı
 Dereşemsettin
 Elmabahçe
 Erkoca
 Gökpınar
 Gülümbe
 Hasandere
 İkizce
 İlyasbey
 İlyasça
 Kapaklı
 Karaağaç
 Kavaklı
 Kendirli
 Kepirler
 Kınık
 Kızıldamlar
 Koyunköy
 Künceğiz
 Küplü
 Kurtköy
 Kuyubaşı
 Necmiyeköy
 Okluca
 Ören
 Selbükü
 Selöz
 Şükraniye
 Sütlük
 Taşçılar
 Ulupınar
 Yeniköy

References

Districts of Bilecik Province